Ambar may refer to:

 Hambar, a Balkan or Central European building for drying maize
 Arda (Middle-earth), a fictional name of Earth in J. R. R. Tolkien's stories
 AmBAR, American Business Association of Russian Professionals 
 Ambar - Ideas on Paper S.A., a Portuguese company
 Ambar, Bismil, a village in Turkey
 Ambar, Pakistan, a village in Pakistan
 Amber (film), a 1952 Indian film

See also
 Amba (disambiguation)
 Amber (disambiguation)